or  is a lake that lies in the municipality of Sørfold in Nordland county, Norway. The water flows out into the Sleipdalselva river and the water is used for power generation at the Lakshola hydroelectric power station.

See also
 List of lakes in Norway
 Geography of Norway

References

Sørfold
Lakes of Nordland